Property damage (sometimes called property destruction, damage to property, or criminal damage in England and Wales) is damage or destruction of real or tangible personal property, caused by negligence, willful destruction, or an act of nature. Destruction of property (sometimes called destruction) is a sub-type of property damage that involves more severe physical damage towards property that is irreparable or extremely expensive to repair.

It is similar to vandalism (deliberate damage, destruction, or defacement) and arson (destroying property with fire) due to these crimes involving unlawfully destroying and damaging a person’s property, property damage includes vandalizing property that is permanently attached to the ground, or those that are movable by people who own the property, while causing more physical damage than vandalism. It can also be a synonym or term under these categories.

See also
Criminal mischief
Criminal damage in English law
Arson
Vandalism

References
 

Criminal law
Property insurance
Vandalism
Problem behavior
Property crimes